Mario Hopenhaym (March 8, 1926 in Buenos Aires, Argentina – May 7, 2016) was a Uruguayan basketball referee. He refereed international games from 1963 to 1984. Tournaments he worked include 1964 Olympic Games and 1968 Olympic Games, 1967 World Championships, 1971 World Women's Championship and 1975 World Women's Championship. He served as Technical Commissioner in the Olympics in 1992, 1996, 2000 and 2004. In 2006, he was awarded the FIBA Order of Merit. He was enshrined in the FIBA Hall of Fame in 2007.

References

External links
 FIBA Hall of Fame page on Hopenhaym

1926 births
2016 deaths
People from Buenos Aires
FIBA Hall of Fame inductees
Basketball in Uruguay